Skirt is the lower part of a dress or gown, or an outer garment serving this purpose.

Skirt or Skirts may also refer to:

Arts, entertainment, and media
 "Skirt" (song), a 2013 by Kylie Minogue
 Skirts (film), a 1921 American silent comedy film
 Skirts (TV series), an Australian television series

Underwater diving
 Skirt, the body of a diving mask providing a watertight seal between the lens and the face
 Skirts, the jacket and trouser waistbands of a two-piece dry suit overlapped and rolled together to provide a watertight seal

Other uses
 Skirt, the part of a hovercraft that inflates with air allowing the craft to hover
 Skirt steak, a cut of beef steak